Miura Brothers Stadium (is a baseball stadium in Hormigueros, Puerto Rico.  It hosted some of the baseball games for the 2010 Central American and Caribbean Games.

References

2010 Central American and Caribbean Games venues